The Baotou–Yinchuan high-speed railway is a high-speed railway in China.

History
On 16 August 2018, construction began on the section from Yinchuan to Huinong South. On 17 May 2022, construction of the remaining section between Huinong South and Yinchuan began.

Route
The railway roughly follows the Baotou–Lanzhou railway.

Stations
Baotou
Baiyanhua West
Urat Front Banner West
Wuyuan East
Linhe West
Dengkou West
Jiangui East
Wuhai Haibowan
Wuhai South
Huinong South
Shuizuishan South
Shahu
Yinchuan
Bayanhaote branch:
Barunbieli
Bayanhaote

References

High-speed railway lines in China
High-speed railway lines under construction